Elizabethtown is a hamlet and census-designated place (CDP) in the town of Elizabethtown in Essex County, New York, United States. The population of the CDP was 754 at the 2010 census, out of a total town population of 1,163.

Elizabethtown is the county seat of Essex County and the location of the town government. The name is taken from that of Elizabeth Gilliland, the wife of an early settler and investor, William Gilliland.

History 
The community was developed by settlers moving deeper into the town from the first settlement in New Russia. Elizabethtown became the county seat in 1807. Due to the focus on government, the law profession was a prominent occupation after the middle of the 19th century. Elizabethtown incorporated as a village in 1876, but the village government dissolved itself in 1981.

The courthouse 

The Essex County Courthouse is located in Ellizabethtown. The night of December 6, 1859, John Brown's body lay there in state, with six local citizens, including Orlando Gibbons, as honor guard. The county later commissioned a life-size portrait of Brown, which hangs in the courthouse today (2021). "An early county clerk" framed these words from John Brown's last speech:

Geography 
Elizabethtown is in the northern part of the town, located at the junction of US Route 9 and NY 9N. The Boquet River (pronounced BO-kwet) flows past the east side of the hamlet.

Demographics

References

External links 
  Essex County Courthouse

Census-designated places in New York (state)
County seats in New York (state)
Former villages in New York (state)
Census-designated places in Essex County, New York
Populated places disestablished in 1981